Oľšov is a village and municipality in the Sabinov District in the Prešov Region of north-eastern Slovakia.

History

In historical records the village was first mentioned in 1309.  The coat of arms of Oľšov shows three fish which represents the bountiful fishing that was provided by the nearby Torysa River.  Below is a chronology of the Hungarian and Slovak names of the village:
1224 - Elsa
1309 - Olsowa
1329 - Vlusa
1336 - Olschwicha
1773 - Olsso, Ollyso, Olyso
1786 - Olyscho
1808 - Olsó, Olysó, Olssawa, Olssowce
1863 - 1913 - Olysó
1920 - Oľšov, Oľšovce
1927 - Oľšov

Geography
The municipality lies at an altitude of 461 meters (1,525 feet) and covers an area of 10.17 km2 (3.9 miles2).  It has a population of about 407.

References

External links
http://www.obecolsov.sk/
http://www.e-obce.sk/obec/olsov/olsov.html/

Villages and municipalities in Sabinov District
Šariš